The Delhi News-Record is a newspaper owned by Postmedia Network that serves the area surrounding the community of Delhi in Norfolk County, Ontario, Canada.

See also
List of newspapers in Canada

References
 The Delhi News-Record online
 Haldimand Norfolk Information Centre

Norfolk County, Ontario
Publications with year of establishment missing
Daily newspapers published in Ontario